The Russian Wheelchair Curling Championship is the national championship of wheelchair curling in Russia. It has been held annually since 2007, organized by Russian Curling Federation.

List of champions and medallists
(teams line-up in order: skip/fourth, third, second, lead, alternate, coach)

References

See also
Russian Men's Curling Championship
Russian Women's Curling Championship
Russian Mixed Curling Championship
Russian Mixed Doubles Curling Championship
Russian Junior Curling Championships
Russian Senior Curling Championships

Curling competitions in Russia
National curling championships
National championships in Russia
Recurring sporting events established in 2007
2007 establishments in Russia